Cathrine Gyldensted (born 1973) is a Danish journalist, author, correspondent, and news presenter and since 2011 the originator of innovating journalism through behavioural sciences like positive psychology, moral psychology  and prospection known as constructive journalism. She coined the term, academically, in 2017 with Karen McIntyre.

Much of Gyldensted's method and framework belong within the domain of constructive journalism. In December 2015, she was appointed the world's first Director of Constructive Journalism at the Journalism School at Windesheim University of Applied Sciences in the Netherlands. She left Windesheim in July 2017 and co-founded Constructive Journalism Network based in Amsterdam, a journalistic online network based in Amsterdam focusing on constructive journalism and research pertaining to constructive journalism.

Early and personal life 
Gyldensted was born in Copenhagen and lived in 1983 with her mother and sister in Saudi Arabia, but later moved to Slagelse, Denmark, graduating in 1991 from Slagelse Gymnasium og HF-kursus. In 1996 she is admitted to the Danish School of Media and Journalism and graduated in February 2000 specializing in foreign reporting and radio journalism. Gyldensted's parents are Carsten Gyldensted, professor emeritus, Neuroradiology, Center of Functionally Integrative Neuroscience - CFIN at Aarhus University and Merete Gyldensted retired Senior Physician at Slagelse Sygehus.

She lives in Copenhagen with Torsten Jansen, a former US correspondent and News Anchor at Danish Broadcasting Corporation In 2008, they wrote the book Obama City together about power structures in Washington D.C.

Career 
Gyldensted began her career in journalism working for Radioavisen at Danish Broadcasting Corporation. She was then hired as a TV reporter for TV Avisen in 2001 with shorter editorial TV projects elsewhere within Danish Broadcasting Corporation She was appointed an extra correspondent for Danish Broadcasting Corporation moving to Washington in 2007. She remained there until 2011, before returning to Copenhagen embarking on her work with developing the constructive journalism framework and research. In 2003 she was nominated for the Cavling Prize for uncovering rare cancers amongst retired army radar personnel in NATO.

In her time with Danish Broadcasting Corporation, she has met such US politicians as Madeleine Albright, Hillary Clinton and Barack Obama and the musician David Bowie.

She was the head editor of the live talk show Clement Direkte with Clement Kjersgaard in 2004. In 2011, she was anchoring a foreign news radio show “Globus” and the culture show “AK24syv” both at the Danish national radio station, Radio24syv. Gyldensted has written two books, “From Mirrors to Movers. Five elements of Constructive Journalism”., and "Blev Du Klogere. A Depolarizing Debate Format"., and co-written six others: “Reporting beyond the problem. From Civic Journalism to Solutions Journalism”,
“Obama City”, “Håndbog i Konstruktiv Journalistik”, “En Konstruktiv Nyhed”, “Glimt Af Amerika”, and “Gurubogen”.

References

External links
 ‘Constructive journalism’ course aims to eliminate unnecessary negativity in the press, Claudia Cahalane, Positive News, 7 March 2013
 Why constructive journalism can help engage the audience, Catalina Albeanu, Journalism.co.uk, 18 August 2014
 Why we need Constructive Elements in Journalism, Cathrine Gyldensted, TEDxDresden, 11 September 2016
 ‘Cathrine Gyldensted weg bij Windesheim, Dolf Rogmans, Villamedia, 15 July 2017

1973 births
Living people
Writers from Copenhagen
Danish journalists